Capt'n Sailorbird is an American syndicated animated television series which debuted in 1959.  An anthology series of sorts, the Sailorbird character introduced (via newly animated wraparound segments) foreign language cartoons which were reedited and dubbed into English for the series by Paul Killiam. 190 five-minute episodes were produced, which were inserted into individual stations' children's shows.  Longer cartoons were serialized over the course of multiple episodes.

The series was distributed by Sterling Films.

External links

1950s American animated television series
1960s American animated television series
1950s American anthology television series
1960s American anthology television series
1959 American television series debuts
1960 American television series endings
American children's animated anthology television series
Animated television series about birds
English-language television shows
First-run syndicated television programs in the United States